The Nothing Man is a 1953 novel by Jim Thompson.

Plot
War has left Clinton Brown permanently disfigured by a terrible military accident.  He works as a rewrite man for Pacific City's Courier newspaper.  Brown's wife Ellen returns to Pacific City, ready to do whatever it takes to get Brown back. Even if it means exposing his deepest secret.

References

1953 American novels
Novels by Jim Thompson
Novels about alcoholism
English-language novels